Gord McIlquham (born 9 January 1961) is a Canadian sailor. He competed in the men's 470 event at the 1988 Summer Olympics.

References

External links
 

1961 births
Living people
Canadian male sailors (sport)
Olympic sailors of Canada
Sailors at the 1988 Summer Olympics – 470
Sportspeople from Kingston, Ontario